Babur-e Kord (also Romanized as Bābur-e Kord;babur or baber means Tiger in Persian also known as Qez Qal‘eh) is a village in Yowla Galdi Rural District, in the Central District of Showt County, West Azerbaijan Province, Iran. At the 2006 census, its population was 201, in 39 families.

References 

Populated places in Showt County